John Farnham and Tom Jones – Together in Concert is an Australian tour featuring John Farnham and Tom Jones performing together for ten concerts throughout the capital cities of Perth, Sydney, Brisbane, and Melbourne. Jones sings his major hits, before Farnham performs his set including hits "One", "Pressure Down", "That's Freedom", "Heart's On Fire", "Playing To Win", "Every Time You Cry", "Man Of The Hour", "Age Of Reason" and "Burn For You". The pair then return to the stage together to perform four duets of soul classics: Sam and Dave's "Hold On I'm Coming", Otis Redding's "Try A Little Tenderness", Ray Charles' "What'd I Say", Arthur Conley's "Sweet Soul Music" and AC/DC's rock anthem, "Long Way To The Top".

On 31 May 2005, a CD album and DVD video were released from a show at the Rod Laver Arena at Melbourne Park. The DVD release debuted at number 1 on the Australian charts, with the album reaching number 3, and being awarded as 3× platinum.

Track listing
 "Mama Told Me Not to Come"  (Randy Newman) - 3:21
 "200 Pounds of Heavenly Joy"  (Willie Dixon) - 3:04
 "Man of the Hour"  (Sean Hosein, Dane DeViller, Steve Kipner) - 4:25
 "What Am I Living For"  (Art Harris, Fred Jay) - 2:41
 "It's Not Unusual"  (Gordon Mills, Les Reed) - 2:34
 "Burn for You"  (Phil Buckle, John Farnham, Ross Fraser) - 4:22
 "Playing to Win"  (Graeham Goble, John Farnham, David Hirschfelder, Stephen Housden, Spencer Proffer, Wayne Nelson, Steven Prestwich) - 3:06
 "My Yiddishe Momme"  (Lew Pollack, Jack Yellen) - 2:29
 "You're the Voice"  (Maggie Ryder, Chris Thompson, Andy Qunta, Keith Reid) - 4:39
 "That Driving Beat"  (Willie Mitchell) - 3:04
 "Hold On, I'm Coming"  (Isaac Hayes, David Porter) - 3:17
 "Try a Little Tenderness"  (Harry M. Woods, James Campbell, Reginald Connelly) - 4:03
 "What'd I Say"  (Ray Charles) - 4:42
 "Sweet Soul Music"   (Sam Cooke, Otis Redding, Arthur Conley) - 3:26
 "It's a Long Way to the Top (If You Wanna Rock 'n' Roll)"  (Malcolm Young, Angus Young, Bon Scott) - 5:34

Charts

Weekly charts

Year-end charts

Certifications

References

2005 live albums
Tom Jones (singer) albums
John Farnham live albums
John Farnham video albums
Collaborative albums
Live video albums